"Angry Johnny" is the debut single by Poe, released in 1995 from her debut album Hello. The song received heavy radio airplay, and an accompanying music video was shown frequently on MTV.

Background
Despite its success and positive critical reviews, "Angry Johnny" was the only commercial single released in Australia; however, a variety of promotional singles were released across the world. "Angry Johnny" was also included on the 1996 album Big Shiny Tunes.

Poe mentions Johnny again in her second album, Haunted, on the song "Dear Johnny".

Composition
"Angry Johnny" has a slow rhythm and, like much of Hello, incorporates layered vocal tracks. The single was produced by Matt Sorum.

A "Full Band Version" of the song was also released, which was more acoustic than the album version and heavily featured cello.

Critical reception
Billboard praised the single, particularly the "fun and clever sexual euphemisms" of the lyrics.

Chart performance
"Angry Johnny" peaked at #7 on the Billboard Modern Rock Tracks chart.

In popular culture
A two-second clip of "Angry Johnny" was included in the endpapers of the US hardcover version of Mark Z. Danielewski's novel House of Leaves, in the form of hexadecimal numbers that, when compiled in a hex editor, could be turned into an AIFF audio file.

Australian CD single track listing
Length: 12 min 51 sec

Personnel
Lyrics: Poe. Production: RJ Rice.
Lyrics: Poe. Production: RJ Rice & Poe (co-producer).

Charts

References

External links

1995 songs
1995 debut singles
Poe (singer) songs
Songs about fictional male characters